Beach volleyball is among the sports contested at the 2022 Commonwealth Games, to be held in Birmingham, England. This will be the second staging of beach volleyball at the Commonwealth Games since its debut four years prior, and therefore the first staging within England specifically.

Both tournaments are scheduled to take place between 30 July and 7 August 2022.

Schedule
The competition schedule is as follows:

Full match schedules were released on 1 July 2022.

Venue
The competitions will be held in a temporary Games-time venue at the brownfield site in Smithfield, named after the market that once stood in its place.

The venue will also play host to 3x3 basketball, 3x3 wheelchair basketball, and the start of the marathon; after the Games, it will be dismantled and the site subject to a redevelopment scheme.

Medal summary

Medal table

Medallists

Qualification
Twelve nations qualify for each tournament at the 2022 Commonwealth Games:
 The host nation.
 The top five Commonwealth nations in the FIVB Beach Volleyball World Rankings between 16 April 2018 and 31 March 2022, excluding the host nation.
 The highest-placed nation not yet qualified from each of the five regional qualifiers (four of six FIVB regions, plus the Oceania CGF region).
 One nation not already qualified receives a CGF/FIVB Bipartite Invitation.

Summary

Men

Women

;Scheduling issues

References

External links
 Official website: 2022 Commonwealth Games – Beach Volleyball

Beach volleyball at the 2022 Commonwealth Games
Beach volleyball at the Commonwealth Games
2022 Commonwealth Games events
Commonwealth Games
International volleyball competitions hosted by the United Kingdom